DiGiorno and Delissio are a co-owned brand of frozen pizzas sold in the United States and Canada, respectively, and are currently subsidiaries of Nestlé.

About
DiGiorno manufactures over 250,000 pizzas each day for consumers for national sale in the mainland United States. Total revenue from pizza sales in 2017 was just over $1 billion.  The DiGiorno product line originally offered pastas and sauces in 1991, and pizzas have been available internationally in Canada and the U.S. since 1995.

The brand's slogan is "It's not delivery. It's DiGiorno/Delissio," which suggests that their frozen pizzas are of high enough quality that they might be mistaken for fresh pizzeria pizzas.

DiGiorno rebranded to Delissio in Canada in 1999, although Kraft had previously used the Delissio brand for other pizza products in the 1980s.

In 2010, Kraft sold the DiGiorno and Delissio brands, along with the rest of its frozen pizza business, to Swiss-based food manufacturer Nestlé. The move helped to finance Kraft's bid for Cadbury, while also effectively ensuring that Nestlé would not submit a competing bid for the confectionery company. Since Nestlé acquired Kraft's frozen pizza business, the DiGiorno brand has expanded to include bonus appetizers in a box, including breadsticks, boneless chicken pieces called Wyngz, and Toll House cookies.

In 2013, DiGiorno's dairy supplier, Foremost Farms USA, dropped Wiese Brothers Farm after the animal rights organization Mercy for Animals released undercover footage showing workers there beating, dragging, and whipping dairy cows, some of which appear unable to walk, while others have infected or freely bleeding wounds. Nestlé and Foremost Farms USA denied any knowledge of the abuse.

Recent news

In 2013, DiGiorno had reached a four-year low sales growth, and the company decided to sell some of its assets to revamp its portfolio. However, the frozen food market is expected to grow globally, despite the continued demand for organic food and healthy diet. Following this optimistic news, the executive vice president of Nestle expressed his high hopes in the future growth of DiGiorno. Later that year, DiGiorno announced that it would launch the "Design A Pizza Kit," a customizable pizza which included a cheese pizza with individually wrapped meats, vegetables, shredded cheese and a seasoning packet.

On September 2, 2014, DiGiorno posted a tweet that read "#WhyIStayed You had pizza." The WhyIStayed hashtag went viral in the midst of a controversy brought out by the Ray Rice scandal of Domestic Abuse. There was a great amount of negative feedback from Twitter users aimed at the DiGiorno Twitter account. DiGiorno issued an apology promptly after the backlash it had received. The hashtag was a central point where women had been discussing why they had stayed in abusive and violent relationships. DiGiorno stated they did not know what the hashtag was about before posting the tweet.

In May 2018, DiGiorno took part in a social media competition campaign run by internet entertainers Kinda Funny titled "1st Annual Best Friend Tournament". The Twitter poll–based competition saw DiGiorno beating competition such as Napa Smith Gallery, Portillo's Restaurants and Oreo. The frozen pizza brand reached the semifinals where they were narrowly beaten by Rooster Teeth employee Barbara Dunkelman, who received 55% of 72,820 votes cast.

In February 2023, Nestle Canada announced their intentions to wind down and exit the frozen meals and pizza business within the next six months.

See also
 List of frozen food brands

References

External links

 

Products introduced in 1995
Frozen pizza brands
Nestlé brands